With a total vertical drop of , Cochrans Falls is tied with Caledonia Cascade as the second tallest waterfall in Georgia. This cascading waterfall is located in Dawson County, northwest of Dawsonville, Georgia and is in the vicinity of the tallest waterfall in the state, Amicalola Falls. The largest drop is near the top of Cochrans Falls and is accessible by a treacherous trail that ascends the right side of the falls.

External links
Photograph of Cochrans Falls by J. D. Anthony
World Waterfall Database entry for Cochrans Falls
TopoQuest Map of Cochrans Falls

Waterfalls of Georgia (U.S. state)
Protected areas of Dawson County, Georgia
Landforms of Dawson County, Georgia